Julie Martin may refer to:

 Julie Martin (Neighbours), a fictional Australian soap-opera character
 Julie Martin (writer), U.S. television writer and producer
 Julie Martin (Miss Northern Ireland), 1997 winner of Miss Northern Ireland
 Julie Martin (artist), contemporary artist and author